Murder 2 is a 2011 Indian Hindi-language psychological thriller film and the second installment in the Murder film series. A quasi-sequel to the 2004 film, Murder, it stars Emraan Hashmi, Jacqueline Fernandez and Prashant Narayanan, and features Sulagna Panigrahi as a debutant. Directed by Mohit Suri and produced by Mukesh Bhatt, the film was released on 8 July 2011. It is one of the highest grossing Bollywood films of 2011. The film is alleged to be based on the 2008 South Korean film The Chaser, though Bhatt denied this and said that it was inspired from the 2006 Nithari killings in Noida. The film is remembered for its erotic scenes.

Plot 
Arjun Bhagwat is a money-hungry ex cop involved in committing crimes. An atheist, he regularly visits the church to donate money to orphans. He has a sexual relationship with a model, Priya who harbors romantic feelings for Arjun, however he can only have a no-strings-attached relationship and nothing else.

Arjun makes a deal with a gangster and pimp, Sameer (Shekhar Shukla), to solve the mystery of the unexplained disappearance of his prostitutes. While investigating, Arjun finds a phone number linked to the missing girls. He tells Sameer to send a prostitute to that number. Sameer decides to send Reshma,  a college newcomer in the business, who has chosen this work to feed her family, but keeps this a secret from them. Reshma is sent to the house of Dheeraj Pandey  who is actually a psychopathic murderer responsible for torturing and killing the missing hookers. He decides to do the same with Reshma and throws her in a dark well, with the intention of torturing her till she dies.

Arjun discovers that Dheeraj is the murderer and informs the police. While Dheeraj is held in jail, the commissioner calls a psychiatrist to extract his confession. Dheeraj tells the doctor that he kills women because he thinks they take advantage of men. Dheeraj is eventually released under Nirmala Pandit's influence. Meanwhile, Reshma escapes from the well and tries to find her way out through the forest.

Arjun meets Dheeraj's family, and the family reveals that Dheeraj used to beat his wife. Up next, he meets a private dancer, Sonia, who was also tortured by Dheeraj but managed to escape. Arjun then meets an idol-maker who used to work with Dheeraj. The maker tells him that Dheeraj used to make idols of devils instead of deities and killed the factory owner who tried to stop him. Inspector Sadaa (Sudhanshu Pandey) informs Arjun that Dheeraj is free, and the police try to track him down as quickly as possible. Nirmala and Dheeraj enter the same temple where Reshma is hiding. Nirmala and the priest, who had both been unaware of Dheeraj's true nature, are killed by Dheeraj, but not before the priest reveals that Reshma is also there. Dheeraj finds the terrified Reshma who urinates (out of fear) on seeing him. Dheeraj then brutally murders her, escaping just before Arjun and the cops arrive. Arjun finds Reshma's body and breaks down, feeling guilty and responsible for her death.

Dheeraj targets Priya next, whom he calls for a photoshoot and tries to torture, but Arjun saves her, engaging Dheeraj in a fight as police officers show up. They request Arjun not to kill Dheeraj. Dheeraj then plays the tape he recorded when he was torturing Reshma. Hearing Reshma's pleading cries, Arjun, tormented by her death and blaming himself for it, furiously stabs Dheeraj multiple times until being stopped by inspector Sadaa, but after witnessing the bestiality of Dheeraj in the form of Reshma's cries, Sadaa ultimately shoots him, ending his reign of terror once and for all. As the film ends, Arjun visits a church with Priya, implying that he had faith in God and Priya's near-death has made him realize his love for her.

Cast

Production and filming 
The film was shot in Mumbai and Goa. Earlier, Bipasha Basu was offered the part of the leading lady, but she refused. Then Mohit Suri offered the leading role to Asin Thottumkal, who deemed the role of the female lead 'not powerful enough' and also declined the role. The part was then offered to Jacqueline Fernandez, though actress Sonal Chauhan was also considered.

After declining the lead role, Basu was offered the item number "Aa Zara". When she declined again, the role was offered to Yana Gupta, who accepted.

The scene featuring the song "Haal-E-Dil" had to be partly re-shot in order to make it more suitable for use in television promos.

Yana Gupta's item number "Aa Zara" was not shown during television promos as it was deemed too violent for audiences under 18. Instead, an alternative music video for the song was shot with Jacqueline Fernandez and Emraan Hashmi, which was aired on television and was used to promote the song. The original scene with Yana was still used in the film.

The DVD of the film was released on 1 August 2011.

Critical reception 
Murder 2 received mixed to positive reviews from various critics of India. Taran Adarsh of Bollywood Hungama gave it 4/5 stars and wrote: "Murder 2 is one of the finest crime stories to come out of the Hindi film industry. Also, as a film, it lives up to the expectations that you may associate from a sequel of a smash hit". Nikhat Kazmi of The Times Of India gave it 3.5/5 stars commenting, "Murder 2 has enough to give the masses a mast time". IANS gave it 3/5 stars. Komal Nahta of Koimoi rated Murder 2 with 3/5 stars and said that "it doesn't have too much to offer in terms of entertainment as it is a dark film but its plus points are the abundant sex scenes and the good music. Its reasonable budget on the one hand, and wonderful recovery from sale of its satellite, music and worldwide theatrical rights on the other have ensured that the producers have made a handsome profit before release". Pankaj Sabnani of Glamsham gave it 3/5 stars, while writing that "an intriguing plot supported by superb performances, make MURDER 2 a 'killer' film". Daily Bhaskar also gave it 3/5 stars, stating that "if Emraan plus Jacqueline under the name Murder 2 don't arise your interest enough, then the story will surely do the trick".

Saibal Chatterjee of NDTV gave the movie 2.5/5 stars. Raja Sen of Rediff gave it 1.5/5 stars and wrote in his review: "Murder 2 is flat, boring and not worth talking about. Even Emraan, sporting less stubble than usual, seems baby-faced as he goes through the motions. It might be inspired by some obscure film, but I don't even care enough to look for its name. By now, I've come to accept that the Bhatts have a bigger DVD collection than me. I do wish they'd stop flaunting it, though". Sudhish Kamath of The Hindu said: "At best, Murder 2 is a show reel for the talented Prashant Narayanan, a men's room glossy featuring the saucy Jacqueline Fernandez and just another day on the job for serial kisser Emraan Hashmi".

Box office 
The film opened with full houses across India with occupancy ranging from 70 to 100%, earning . The film grossed  in its opening weekend. The film went on to gross  in its first week, although collections were affected on 13–14 July due to the bomb blasts in Mumbai on 11 July 2011. , Box Office India claimed that it was the 28th biggest opening week of all time. The movie dominated the single screens despite new releases and grossed  in the second week despite limited multiplex release. Overall the film collected a gross of 115 crore with a budget of 50 crore worldwide.

Soundtrack

Track list 
The film's score was composed by Raju Singh, while the songs were composed by Mithoon, Harshit Saxena and Sangeet-Sidharath. All songs became popular in 2011. Lyrics are penned by Mithoon, Kumaar and Sayeed Quadri. "Haal E Dil" and "Phir Mohabbat" declared chartbusters. Songs are as follows:

Reception 
The album received positive reviews from critics. Joginder Tuteja from Bollywood Hungama gave the album a 3/5 stars saying that "Murder 2 turns out to be a good deal overall". Musicaloud gave the album 3.5/5 stars.

Awards and nominations

Sequel 
After the success of the first two installments, the producers released a third film Murder 3, on 15 February 2013. The film, which was an official remake of Spanish film The Hidden Face, starred Randeep Hooda, Aditi Rao Hydari and Sara Loren in lead roles. However, unlike the earlier parts, it was a flop at the box office.

References

Further reading

External links 
 
 

2011 films
2010s Hindi-language films
2011 psychological thriller films
Cross-dressing in Indian films
Films scored by Sangeet Haldipur
Films scored by Siddharth Haldipur
Films scored by Mithoon
Films scored by Harshit Saxena
Indian remakes of South Korean films
2010s erotic thriller films
Indian sequel films
Indian slasher films
2010s psychological horror films
2011 action thriller films
Indian serial killer films
Indian action thriller films
Indian erotic thriller films
Indian psychological thriller films
T-Series (company) films
Films directed by Mohit Suri